Digrammia muscariata is a species of geometrid moth in the family Geometridae. It is found in North America.

The MONA or Hodges number for Digrammia muscariata is 6377.

Subspecies
These three subspecies belong to the species Digrammia muscariata:
 Digrammia muscariata muscariata (Guenée in Boisduval & Guenée, 1858)
 Digrammia muscariata respersata (Hulst, 1880)
 Digrammia muscariata teucaria (Strecker, 1899)

References

Further reading

External links

 

Macariini
Articles created by Qbugbot
Moths described in 1858